Lakshmanan Ramasamy (born 23 January 1948), known professionally as Chitra Lakshmanan, is an Indian journalist, filmmaker and actor. He produced and directed several Tamil language films starring some of Tamil cinema's major stars during the 1980s and 1990s, while appearing in numerous films and television series in supporting roles. He currently operates a YouTube channel called Touring Talkies, which features interviews and talk shows about Tamil cinema.

Career

Lakshmanan began working in a hardware shop in Arani. He later joined the magazine Vidhi Velli as a sub-editor until its closure. He later joined Thayin Manikodi run by Jayakanthan. He later joined a Singaporean Tamil magazine. After it's failure, he decided to start his own magazine Thirai Kathir which became successful. His career in entertainment journalism helped him to also become a public relations officer.

He became acquainted with director Bharathiraja to enter the film industry, and subsequently served as a co-producer on all his films with Lakshmanan's brother, Ramu. In 1983, he produced Mann Vasanai under Gayathri Films, which won commercial success as well as the Filmfare Award for Best Tamil Film. He also served as a press relations officer for Tamil films during the 1980s, and later reprised that role as an actor through Uttama Villain (2015). His first directorial venture was Soora Samhaaram (1988) with Kamal Haasan and later he directed Periya Thambi (1997) with Prabhu and Chinna Raja (1999) with Karthik in the lead role. He turned actor in Japanil Kalyanaraman (1985) and began to prioritise acting commitments in the 2000s, winning acclaim for his comedy roles in Boss Engira Bhaskaran (Nene Ambhani) (2010) and Theeya Velai Seiyyanum Kumaru (2013).

Throughout his career, Lakshmanan has also taken up posts of responsibility. He served as the Secretary of Tamil Film Producers Council for four years and as an executive committee member in South Indian Film Chamber of Commerce, Film Federation of India, and Tamil Film Directors Association for several years. In 2011, he published the book 80 Years of Tamil Cinema, an account documenting the history of Tamil cinema.

Filmography

As producer

As director and producer

As writerIdhuthan Kadhala (1997) (dialogues only)Rekha IPS'' - Kalaignar TV (story only)

As actor
Films

Television

Voice actor

References

External links

Film directors from Tamil Nadu
Tamil film directors
Indian male film actors
Tamil male actors
Living people
1948 births
Indian male television actors
Male actors from Tamil Nadu
20th-century Indian male actors
21st-century Indian male actors
Tamil film producers
Film producers from Tamil Nadu
20th-century Indian film directors